Valor Christian Academy is a private transitional kindergarten through middle grades Christian school in Redondo Beach, California, in the Los Angeles metropolitan area. It was previously known as Coast Christian School but received its current name in September 2012. It was affiliated with the Assemblies of God.

History
Pastor Wilbur Wacker and Calvary Church of the Coastlands established the school in 1977.

 it was named Coast Christian Schools (CCS), served grades Kindergarten through 12, and had two campuses in Redondo Beach, both leased from the Redondo Beach City School District, and the school also maintained a campus in Harbor City. By 1999 it had six campuses, with five in Redondo Beach and one in Torrance.

Circa 2012 Ambassador High School, a Christian high school, was supposed to begin using the Valor Christian campus but there were issues with the Redondo Beach city council, which postponed the decision on whether the school was permitted to open there.

Operations
As of 1992 all teachers must be Christians but they were not required to have educational credentials from the State of California.

As of 1999 these were the campuses (all except for one were in Redondo Beach):
 Prospect Campus - Two years through PreKindergarten
 Inglewood Campus - Infant through PreKindergarten
 Elementary Campus - Kindergarten through Grade 5
 Middle School Campus - Grades 6 through 8
 Accelerated Learning Center in Redondo Beach - Grades 6-12
 Accelerated Learning Center in Torrance - Grades 9-12

Demographics
As of the 1991–1992 school year it had 390 students. Of its elementary students, 77% were Anglo White, 10% were Black, 8% were Asian, and 5% were Latino; and of the secondary students, 35% were Black, 30% were Anglo, 20% were Latino, and 15% were Asian. Many of the minority students lived in Hawthorne, Inglewood, and other areas, and would have otherwise attended public schools. Jean Merl of the Los Angeles Times wrote that the secondary campus was "well-integrated" and that it "appears free of the racial tensions that have split some of the nearby public high schools."

References

External links
 
 Coast Christian Schools (Archive)

Christian schools in California
Private elementary schools in California
Private middle schools in California
Private high schools in California
Redondo Beach, California
High schools in Los Angeles County, California
Schools in Los Angeles County, California
1977 establishments in California
Educational institutions established in 1977